Tirhut Division or Tirhut Commissionary   is an administrative-geographical unit of Bihar in India. Muzaffarpur is the headquarters of the Division. The Division comprises six districts -- Muzaffarpur, West Champaran (headquartered at Bettiah), East Champaran (headquartered at Motihari), Vaishali (headquartered at Hajipur), Sitamarhi and Sheohar.

The administrative head of Tirhut Division is a Commissioner, a senior officer of the Indian Administrative Service (IAS). Tirhut's present Divisional Commissioner is Shri Pankaj Kumar, an IAS officer of the Bihar cadre.

Khudi Ram Bose, Maghfoor Ahmad Ajazi, Manzoor Ahsan Ajazi, Bhagwan Das, Juba Sahni, Raj Kumar Shukla, Ramdayalu Singh, Mathura Singh, Binda Babu and Mahesh Babu were some of the freedom fighters of Tirhut.

Mahatma Gandhi launched his struggle for independence from the East Champaran or Motihari district of this Division in 1916. It was the Karma Bhoomi of Dr. Rajendra Prasad, Acharya J.B. Kripalani and Jai Prakash Narayan.
Motihari is the birthplace of famous writer George Orwell.

References

External links
 Official website 

 
Divisions of Bihar